Eesti Televisioon (ETV) is an Estonian free-to-air television channel owned and operated by Estonian Public Broadcasting. It made its first broadcast on 19 July 1955.

History

Eesti Televisioon (Estonian Television) was launched on 19 July 1955. Before that, television broadcasts in Estonia could only be received from Moscow. The very first Estonian-language TV presenter was Ofelia Mikk, whose debut was in the 19 July 1955 test broadcast. Her tenure in television was cut short, because she misspoke out of nervousness.

The first tenured presenter for the nascent ETV was Ruth Peramets-Püss (1927–2005). To find a presenter, a casting competition was held in 1955, but no suitable person was found. By chance, a film in which she starred, was aired on ETV on the day of the competition, and so she was hired.

Kalmer Tennosaar (1928–2004) began as a presenter on 1 January 1956, and subsequently worked as an editor and fellow of music programmes (1957–1962, and then after 1968). He became very popular as the host of a children's songs show "Entel-tentel". Tennosaar later continued his career as a singer.

On 1 January 1993, ETV was admitted as a full active member of the European Broadcasting Union (EBU). From the restoration of independence in 1991 to 31 December 1992, it was a member of the International Radio and Television Organisation (OIRT).

ETV stopped showing commercials in 1998–1999, and has again ceased doing so since 2002: its low-cost advertising rates were damaging the ability of commercial broadcasters to operate. The introduction of a system of broadcast receiver licences, payable by viewers, was considered, but ultimately rejected in the face of public opposition.

In 2002, ETV hosted the Eurovision Song Contest 2002.

On 9 January 2006, ETV launched an Internet news service called ETV24. Broadcasting news on Internet, teletext, and on ETV at night.

Until 2007 ETV was operated by Eesti Televisioon, the eponymous broadcasting organisation. Pursuant to the new Estonian National Broadcasting Act passed by the Estonian Parliament on 18 January 2007, Eesti Televisioon merged with Eesti Raadio (Estonian Radio, ER) on 1 June 2007 to form the Estonian Public Broadcasting service, or Eesti Rahvusringhääling (ERR). During the consolidation, the ETV24 news service was replaced with ERR Uudised (ERR News).

On 1 July 2010, Estonia completed its transition to digital terrestrial television, discontinuing all analogue services. An informational on-screen message indicating this was visible on the old ETV frequencies until 5 July 2010.

Funding and management
The bulk of ETV's funding comes from government grant-in-aid, around 15% of which is in turn funded by the fees paid by Estonian commercial broadcasters in return for their exclusive right to screen television advertising. ETV itself is editorially fully independent.

Notable personnel
The more well known journalists of ETV include Tõnu Aav, Maire Aunaste, Grete Lõbu, Anu Välba, Katrin Viirpalu, Reet Linna, Monika Tamla, Kadri Hinrikus, Astrid Kannel, Margus Saar, Peeter Kaldre, Mati Talvik, Marko Reikop, Urmas Vaino, Jim Ashilevi, etc.

Notable former personnel
Maire Aunaste, presenter and show host, currently member of parliament
Meelis Kompus, presenter
Urve Tiidus, presenter, currently member of parliament

Notable past personnel
Valdo Pant (1928–1976), journalist and historian
Kalmer Tennosaar (1928–2004), early presenter for ETV, show host and singer
Toomas Uba (1943–2000), sports journalist
Urmas Ott (1955–2008), journalist, presenter and star interviewer
Aarne Rannamäe (1958–2016), journalist (foreign affairs), news anchor and presenter

See also
Eesti Telefilm
Eastern Bloc information dissemination

References

External links

History of ETV 

Television channels in Estonia
Eastern Bloc mass media
Television channels and stations established in 1955
1955 establishments in Estonia
Television in the Soviet Union
Mass media in Tallinn
Eesti Rahvusringhääling